Son of the Beach is an American sitcom that aired from March 14, 2000, to October 1, 2002, on FX. The series is a spoof of Baywatch, with much of the comedy based on sexual double entendres, puns, innuendo and the like. A major running gag portrayed the handsome David Hasselhoff character as a balding, middle-aged, pot-bellied and out-of-shape man who is nonetheless seen by all the other characters as highly fit and attractive. Radio talk show host Howard Stern was one of the executive producers.

Synopsis
The show centered on the adventures of Shore Patrol Force 30 (SPF 30, a pun on the term Sun Protection Factor), led by the pasty, out-of-shape, clueless lifeguard Notch Johnson (Timothy Stack). The rest of his patrol consists of B.J. Cummings (the innocent blonde lifeguard), Jamaica St. Croix (the ghetto-raised, mix-raced lifeguard), Chip Rommel (the dumb, hunky, muscular male lifeguard who is an obvious parody of Arnold Schwarzenegger) and Kimberlee Clark (the smart female lifeguard and straight man of the series). Many of the plots revolved around silly action genre clichés and movie parodies, with many of the feature roles played by actors and celebrities such as Jason Alexander, Mark Hamill, Alan Thicke, Erik Estrada, Gary Coleman, John Salley, Joey Buttafuoco, Patty Hearst, Adam Carolla, Hank the Angry Drunken Dwarf, George Takei, Gilbert Gottfried, Walter Koenig, Pat Morita, Anson Williams, Christopher Darden, Maureen McCormick, Lee Majors, David Arquette, Neil Patrick Harris, Musetta Vander, Angelica Bridges, Ian Ziering, RuPaul, and Dweezil Zappa.

The title is a pun on the phrase "son of a bitch." Likewise, character names are rife with puns and innuendo. Porcelain Bidet, B.J. Cummings, Jamaica St. Croix ("you make a saint cry"), Anita Massengil, and Notch Johnson all refer to some sort of double entendre, while Chip Rommel's name refers to the "Desert Fox", further punctuating the fact that the character is German, his parents being "The Rommels of Paraguay" (South America was a refuge for hunted Nazis at the close of World War II). "Notch" and "B.J." are also parodies of the names of the Baywatch characters played by David Hasselhoff and Pamela Anderson – Mitch and C. J. Kimberlee Clark's name is a pun on the company Kimberly-Clark, manufacturer of paper products such as Kleenex and Kotex.

Cast

Main cast
 Timothy Stack as Notchibald "Notch" Johnson – The world's best lifeguard and leader of the Malibu Adjacent SPF 30, who is the best at everything he tries in spite of being old, overweight, and often clueless.  He is something of a legend in Malibu Adjacent as several locations are named for him such as the Notch Johnson Home for Orphans and Retards and the Notch Johnson Space Center.
 Jaime Bergman as B.J. Cummings – Lovely young woman who grew up poor in the rural South. Naïve about sex but endlessly cheerful and nice.
 Leila Arcieri as Jamaica St. Croix – Tough lifeguard from the inner-city, shaped when she was abandoned by her parents.
 Kim Oja as Kimberlee Clark – Sweet "girl next door" type assigned to SPF 30 as a spy to bring down Notch Johnson, but ended up a loyal team member who falls in love with him.
 Lou Rosenthal as Spank – the monkey who serves as sort of a mascot for SPF 30.
 Roland Kickinger as Chip Rommel – A German bodybuilder.
 Lisa Banes as Mayor Anita Massengil (2000–2001) – Unpleasant Mayor of Malibu Adjacent with an outrageously gay son named Kody, who wants Notch Johnson out of the SPF 30 because everyone likes him more than her and he is better than her at everything.
 Amy Weber as Porcelain Bidet (2002) – An unpleasant, attractive dark-haired gold digger attached to the SPF 30 in Season 3.

Recurring characters
 Anthony Wayne Johnson dancer – In the Line of Booty (2002)
 Candace Kita as Asian female news reporter (4 episodes) (2001–2002)
 Robert Ryan as Professor Milosovic (13 episodes) (2000–2002) – A wheelchair-using genius scientist who enjoys smutty humor.
 Jason Hopkins as Kody Massengil (12 episodes) (2001–2001) – Mayor Massengill's openly gay son, who has a huge crush on Chip Rommel.
 Lynne Marie Stewart as Ellen (11 episodes) (2000–2002) – The friendly beach lesbian and purveyor of fish tacos from her food truck, who seems able to turn any straight woman into her latest fling.
 Vincent Pastore as Vinnie Fellachio (3 episodes) (2000–2002) – Disgusting mobster who is Jamaica's biological father.

Episodes

Series overview

Season 1 (2000)

Season 2 (2001)

Season 3 (2002)

Syndication
Reruns of the series began airing on the Viacom-owned Spike cable channel on November 7, 2010, eight years after its cancellation. It marks the first time the series has aired in the United States since.

Home media
Son of the Beach: Volume 1 was released on April 29, 2003, containing the first 21 episodes of the series (through Season 2 episode "A Tale of Two Johnsons"). The DVD also contains writer/director/cast commentary on select episodes, introductions by Timothy Stack as Notch Johnson, Too Hot for TV montages, behind the scenes featurettes, outtakes, and TV spots.

Son of the Beach: Volume 2 was released on November 11, 2008, and contains the remaining 21 episodes from the series, as well as bonus material such as new menu introductions by Timothy Stack as Notch Johnson, new behind-the-scenes footage, commentaries by the creators of the series, sexy montage highlights, cast audition tapes and a Son of the Beach table read.

References

External links
 
 

2000s American parody television series
2000s American single-camera sitcoms
2000 American television series debuts
2002 American television series endings
2000s American LGBT-related comedy television series
Television series by 20th Century Fox Television
English-language television shows
FX Networks original programming
Television shows set in Los Angeles County, California
Howard Stern
American LGBT-related sitcoms
Beaches in fiction
Works about lifeguards